Thomas Dillard Johnston (April 1, 1840 – June 22, 1902) was a Representative from North Carolina.

Born in Waynesville, Haywood County, North Carolina, April 1, 1840; attended the common schools and Col. Stephen Lee’s Preparatory School, Asheville, N.C.; entered the University of North Carolina at Chapel Hill in 1858, but left in the spring of 1859 on account of failing health; studied law; entered the Confederate Army in the spring of 1861; was admitted to the bar in 1867 and commenced practice in Asheville; mayor of Asheville in 1869; member of the State house of representatives 1870-1874; declined to be a candidate for reelection; served in the State senate in 1876; elected as a Democrat to the Forty-ninth and Fiftieth Congresses (March 4, 1885 – March 3, 1889); was an unsuccessful candidate for reelection in 1888 to the Fifty-first Congress; resumed the practice of law; died in Asheville, N.C., on June 22, 1902; interment in Riverside Cemetery.

Sources 
 

1840 births
1902 deaths
People from Waynesville, North Carolina
Confederate States Army soldiers
Mayors of Asheville, North Carolina
Democratic Party members of the United States House of Representatives from North Carolina
Democratic Party members of the North Carolina House of Representatives
Democratic Party North Carolina state senators
19th-century American politicians